The Clovehitch Killer is a 2018 American coming-of-age thriller film directed by Duncan Skiles and written by Christopher Ford. It stars Dylan McDermott, Charlie Plummer, Samantha Mathis, and Madisen Beaty. The film is set in Kentucky and was also shot there. It premiered at LA Film Festival on September 22, 2018, and received a limited theatrical release on November 16, 2018, distributed by IFC Midnight. The film was mostly inspired by the story of real life serial killer Dennis Rader, also known as the BTK Killer.

Plot 
16 year-old Tyler Burnside lives with his devout Christian family in the small remote town of Clarksville, Kentucky. The town and its residents are haunted by the memory of the Clovehitch Killer, an infamous serial killer who bound and strangled 10 known female victims before apparently disappearing 10 years earlier.

Tyler takes his father's truck one night to see a girl, who finds a bondage photograph between the seats. When word of the photo spreads among the other teenagers in Tyler's church and scout troop, they ostracize him, believing him to be a BDSM fetishist. Tyler, meanwhile, begins to wonder if his father, family man and community leader, Don Burnside, could have something to do with the Clovehitch Killer. Tyler investigates Don's private shed and finds a hidden compartment containing bondage magazines, along with a Polaroid photograph of a beaten and bound woman. Fearing that his father might be the killer, Tyler befriends a teen outcast and amateur Clovehitch historian named Kassi and asks for her help. Kassi is initially skeptical, but they link the photograph to a known Clovehitch victim, find blueprints to a BDSM dungeon in the shed, and when Tyler explores his house's crawl space, he finds a box containing the drivers licenses of the known Clovehitch victims and three other women, as well as more polaroid photographs of beaten and bound women.

Don, now suspicious of Tyler's behavior, takes him camping. To explain the evidence Tyler had uncovered, Don says that the Clovehitch Killer was Tyler's vegetative uncle Rudy, who became paralyzed after the guilt drove him to a suicide attempt. Don says he kept the evidence in hopes of one day giving it to the victims' families. Tyler accepts the explanation, and the two burn all the evidence. Tyler ends the investigation, although Kassi remains unsatisfied with Don's story.

Don surprisingly allows Tyler to attend a scout leadership camp, something he had previously claimed the family had no money for. He then sends his wife Cindy and daughter Susie to visit Cindy's mother for two weeks. Home alone, he photographs himself dressed as a woman in bondage positions, but angrily throws the photos away later. Afterwards, he stalks a woman through town. After casing her house, he breaks in, binds her, and begins strangling her. However, Tyler appears in the house with a rifle, and it is revealed through a flashback that Tyler never left for camp, but was secretly watching Don with Kassi. The flashback also reveals that Kassi's mother, who went missing 10 years prior, was one of the three unknown Clovehitch victims.
Tyler and kassi go to speak to Don but he's not home. There are rope fibres on the bed. They go to the house where they had previously seen him with the stalked woman. Tyler confronts his dad as he is taking photos of the woman tied up. Tyler has a rifle. His father stays surprisingly calm. Tyler tries to talk him into giving himself in. Kassi tries to help the bound woman. His father lies and says they are having an affair and his mother knows. He grabs kassi and knocks her out. Confused Tyler lowers his guard and his father takes the gun from him.  He immediately tries to shoot Tyler with it, only to find the chamber empty. The two scuffle, and Don tries to strangle Tyler until Kassi awakens and knocks Don unconscious. Kassi begins to dial 9-1-1, but Tyler grabs her hand and stops her. Later they discuss the fact the woman never saw his face so can't connect Don to the attack. 

Later, Don has been declared missing, but Tyler's family remains stable. They are informed that the police have discovered Don's body and his death is considered a suicide. At their church, Tyler delivers a eulogy for Don, intercut with scenes of him and Kassi dragging Don, unconscious, into the forest and framing his death as a hunting accident while cleaning his gun. The forest scene ends with Don slowly waking up and Tyler pointing a pistol at his head. His expression seems to show he approves of what Tyler is about to do. Tyler ends the eulogy with, "Dad, if you can hear me, I love you."

Cast

Reception 
Its consensus reads, "The Clovehitch Killer patiently dials up the tension with a story that makes up for a lack of surprises with strong performances and a chilling wit." On Metacritic, the film has a weighted average score of 59/100, based on 11 critics, indicating "mixed or average reviews".

Joseph Hernandez of the Brooklyn Horror Film Festival said that "this small town thriller has a sinister edge and sports an exciting narrative device that flips the story on its head." Justin Lowe of The Hollywood Reporter called the plot "slow...more reliant on atmosphere than action to build suspense...offers an intriguing perspective on the dark side of Americans values...but lacks the conviction to entirely expose the cultural contradictions that often enable compulsive murderers...It's a missed opportunity."

In a 2019 list of the 50 best serial killer movies of all time, Paste magazine ranked The Clovehitch Killer #48, writing "This is a devilish movie that does beautifully what horror films are meant to—vex us with fear—through the most deceptively simple of means." Lauded horror author Stephen King wrote about the film, calling it "an excellent small movie", "unbearably suspenseful", and "(n)ot for the faint of heart".

References

External links 

2018 thriller films
2018 horror films
American thriller films
American serial killer films
Films set in Kentucky
Films shot in Kentucky
Films with screenplays by Christopher Ford (screenwriter)
American coming-of-age films
2010s coming-of-age films
2010s English-language films
2010s American films